Rodrigo Araújo Gomes Costa, or simply Araújo, (born 12 May 1988) is a footballer who currently plays as a defender for Phitsanulok F.C.

He made his professional debut for Boavista F.C. when they played in the Portuguese Liga during the 2007–08 season.

References

1988 births
Living people
Brazilian footballers
Boavista F.C. players
Expatriate footballers in Thailand
Association football defenders